The voiceless retroflex lateral fricative is a type of consonantal sound, used in some spoken languages. The IPA has no symbol for this sound. However, the "belt" of the voiceless lateral fricative is combined with the tail of the retroflex consonants to create the extIPA letter :

Some scholars also posit the voiceless retroflex lateral approximant distinct from the fricative.

Features
Features of the voiceless retroflex lateral fricative:

Occurrence

See also
Index of phonetics articles

Notes

References

External links
 

Lateral consonants
Fricative consonants
Pulmonic consonants
Voiceless oral consonants